Alvin Leonard Bragg Jr. (born October 21, 1973) is an American politician and lawyer from New York State who is serving as the New York County District Attorney. In 2021, he became the first African American and first person of color elected to that office. Bragg previously served as chief deputy attorney general of New York and as an assistant United States Attorney in the Southern District of New York.

Early life and education
Bragg is from Harlem, and grew up on Striver's Row. In an interview with The American Prospect, Bragg noted that he had been "deeply affected by the criminal justice system – most directly through three gunpoint stops by the NYPD." He graduated from the Trinity School before attending Harvard College. He graduated from Harvard cum laude with a Bachelor of Arts in government in 1995 and earned his Juris Doctor from Harvard Law School, where he was an editor of the Harvard Civil Rights–Civil Liberties Law Review.

Early career
Bragg clerked for federal district judge Robert P. Patterson Jr. before he joined the law firm Morvillo Abramowitz Grand Iason & Anello as an associate, where his work focused on white collar fraud and civil rights issues. In 2003, he joined the office of the Attorney General of New York under Eliot Spitzer before becoming the chief of litigation and investigations for the New York City Council. In 2009, Bragg left the city council to serve as assistant United States Attorney in the Southern District of New York.

In 2017, Eric Schneiderman, then serving as attorney general, appointed Bragg Chief Deputy Attorney General of New York. Bragg ran the criminal justice and social justice divisions, overseeing lawsuits brought by the state against the Donald J. Trump Foundation, Harvey Weinstein and The Weinstein Company, and the addition of a citizenship question on the 2020 United States Census. He left the position in December 2018 and became a professor at the New York Law School, where he was co-director of the Racial Justice Project. Bragg is a member of the board of directors for the Legal Aid Society. He has represented the families of Ramarley Graham and Eric Garner in civil litigation against New York City.

New York County District Attorney
In June 2019, Bragg started his candidacy for the 2021 Democratic Party nomination for New York County District Attorney, then held by Cyrus Vance Jr., who did not to run for reelection. Following the June 22, 2021 Democratic primary, Bragg led in the reported vote count and Tali Farhadian Weinstein conceded the primary to Bragg on July 2. On November 2, 2021, Bragg defeated Republican Thomas Kenniff in the general election, becoming the first African-American to be elected New York County District Attorney.

Bragg was sworn into office on January 1, 2022.

Policies on low-level offenses 
On January 4, 2022, after three days in office, he announced that his office would no longer prosecute low-level offenses such as fare evasion, resisting arrest, prostitution, and cannabis-related misdemeanors unless accompanied by a felony charge. He also decided to seek lesser charges for burglaries and store robberies where the offender "displays a dangerous instrument but does not create a genuine risk of physical harm". On January 20, Bragg disputed what he described was a "legalistic" interpretation of his prosecution policy memo and indicated that he supported a zero tolerance policy for violent crimes.

Disagreements over Trump prosecution 
On February 23, 2022, Carey R. Dunne and Mark F. Pomerantz, the lead prosecutors in the New York County District Attorney's investigation into Donald Trump and his businesses, resigned abruptly after Bragg "indicated to them that he had doubts about moving forward with a case against Mr. Trump". In his letter of resignation, Pomerantz wrote that the "team that has been investigating Mr. Trump harbors no doubt about whether he committed crimes,  including falsifying business records, and that it was “a grave failure of justice” not to pursue criminal charges. The New York Times reported that Bragg "balked at pursuing an indictment against Mr. Trump" and lacked confidence proving in court that Trump "knowingly falsified the value of his assets on annual financial statements." The Washington Post noted that Bragg was slow to meet with Dunne and Pomerantz after taking office and when they finally met to discuss the case, a source in the D.A.'s Office commented that Bragg seemed distracted and disengaged, continually checking his cell phone (allegations Bragg's spokesperson denied).

On November 21, 2022, The New York Times the district attorney's office "has moved to jump-start its criminal investigation" into Trump's reported "hush-money payment to a porn star who said she had an affair with Mr. Trump." Bragg confirmed to CNN in January 2023 that the probe was ongoing. On January 30, the office presented evidence to a grand jury regarding Trump's role in the payment.

Jose Alba prosecution 
On July 7, 2022, Jose Alba, a bodega clerk, was attacked by a customer in a dispute over a bag of potato chips. Alba attempted to de-escalate, but after being shoved into a wall, defended himself with a knife, killing the assailant. Bragg, in his prosecutorial discretion, decided to charge Alba and requested bail at $500,000; the judge set it at $250,000. The dead attacker's girlfriend also stabbed Alba with her own knife, after attempting to turn Alba's knife back on him. Bragg declined to charge her. After intense backlash, Bragg ultimately decided to drop the charges against Alba, noting that “a homicide case against Alba could not be proven at trial beyond a reasonable doubt”.

Steve Bannon prosecution 
On September 6, 2022, The Washington Post reported that Steve Bannon would be indicted on September 8 by Bragg's prosecutors on the same charges of fraud that he was federally pardoned for by then-President Trump in 2020. On September 8, Bannon was charged with "defrauding Americans who wanted to contribute to construction of a southern border wall, resurrecting a threat that Mr. Bannon seemed to have escaped with a 2021 presidential pardon," and that he pleaded not guilty.

Personal life
Bragg married Jamila Marie Ponton in 2003. They have two children.

References

1973 births
African-American people in New York (state) politics
American prosecutors
Harvard College alumni
Harvard Law School alumni
Living people
New York (state) Democrats
New York (state) lawyers
New York County District Attorneys
New York Law School faculty
People from Harlem
Politicians from New York City
Trinity School (New York City) alumni